Mahonia aquifolium, the Oregon grape or holly-leaved barberry, is a species of flowering plant in the family Berberidaceae, native to western North America.

The berries are included in the diet of some aboriginal peoples of the Pacific Northwest, and the species is recognized as the state flower of Oregon.

Description

The stems and twigs have a thickened, corky appearance. The leathery leaves resemble those of holly. Each of the six stamens, terminates in two spreading branches. The six yellow petals are enclosed by six yellow sepals. At the base of the flower are three greenish-yellow bracts, less than half as long as the sepals. The spherical berries are dark dusty-blue and tart in taste.

Chemistry 
Mahonia aquifolium contains 5'-methoxyhydnocarpin (5'-MHC), a multidrug resistance pump inhibitor, which works to decrease bacterial resistance in vitro.

Taxonomy 
Some authors place Mahonia in the barberry genus, Berberis. The Oregon-grape is not related to true grapes, but gets its common name from the purple clusters of berries whose color and slightly dusted appearance are reminiscent of grapes.

Etymology 
The Latin specific epithet aquifolium denotes "sharp-leafed" (as in Ilex aquifolium, the common holly), referring to the spiny foliage.

M. aquifolium is not closely related to either the true holly (Ilex aquifolium) or the true grape (Vitis).

Distribution and habitat
M. aquifolium is a native plant in the North American West from Southeast Alaska to Northern California, and eastern Alberta to central New Mexico, often occurring in the understory of Douglas-fir forests (although other forest types contain the species) and in brushlands in the Cascades, Rockies, and northern Sierra Nevada.

Ecology 

As with some Berberis, × Mahoberberis, and other Mahoniae spp., M. aquifolium can serve as an alternate host for Puccinia striiformis f. sp. tritici (the primary host of Pst being wheat). However, in this case it was only achieved by intentional inoculation in a lab, and it remains unknown whether this occurs naturally.

In some areas outside its native range, M. aquifolium has been classified as an invasive exotic species that may displace native vegetation.

Cultivation 
M. aquifolium is a popular subject in shady or woodland plantings. It is valued for its striking foliage and flowers, which often appear before those of other shrubs. It is resistant to summer drought, tolerates poor soils, and does not create excessive leaf litter. Its berries attract birds.

Numerous cultivars and hybrids have been developed, of which the following have gained the Royal Horticultural Society's Award of Garden Merit:
 M. × wagneri 'Pinnacle' (M. aquifolium × M. pinnata)
 'Apollo'

Uses 
The small purplish-black fruits, which are quite tart and contain large seeds, are edible raw after the season's first frosts. They were included in small quantities in the traditional diets of Pacific Northwest indigenous peoples, mixed with salal or another sweeter fruit. Today, they are sometimes used to make jelly, alone or mixed with salal. Oregon-grape juice can be fermented to make wine, similar to European barberry wine folk traditions, although it requires an unusually high amount of sugar.

The inner bark of the larger stems and roots of Oregon grape yield a yellow dye. The berries contain a dye that can be purple, blue, pink, or green depending on the pH of water used to make the dye, due to the berries containing a naturally occurring pH indicator.

Medicinal uses
Some Indigenous peoples of the Northwest Plateau use Oregon grape for indigestion.

The plant contains berberine and reportedly has antimicrobial properties similar to those of goldenseal.

Culture
In 1899, Oregon-grape was recognized as the state flower of Oregon.

See also
Mahonia nervosa

References

External links

 The Oregon Grape in "Our State Flowers: The Floral Emblems Chosen by the Commonwealths", The National Geographic Magazine, XXXI (June 1917), pp. 481–517.
Mahonia aquifolium images at bioimages.vanderbilt.edu
Jepson eFlora (TJM2) treatment of Berberis aquifolium
Calflora Database: Berberis aquifolium (Oregon grape, mountain grape)
Flora of North America @ efloras.org: Berberis aquifolium — syn; formerly: Mahonia aquifolium
UC Photos gallery: Berberis aquifolium
Mountain Grape from Botanical.com

aquifolium
Flora of Western Canada
Flora of the Western United States
Flora of Alaska
Flora of California
Symbols of Oregon
Plants used in Native American cuisine
Plants used in traditional Native American medicine
Bird food plants
Butterfly food plants
Garden plants of North America
Drought-tolerant plants
Flora without expected TNC conservation status